Agrotis trifurca is a moth of the family Noctuidae. It is found in Turkestan, Siberia, south-eastern Ukraine, the Altai Mountains, Tibet, China, Mongolia, the Amur region and the Korean Peninsula. It is also found in the eastern Carpathian Mountains in Romania.

References

External links 
 Fauna Europaea
 Noctuinae (Noctuidae) collection of Siberian Zoological Museum
 Biodiversity of Altai-Sayan Ecoregion
 Korean Insects

Agrotis
Moths described in 1837
Moths of Asia
Moths of Europe